Eric R. Roth (born March 22, 1945) is an American screenwriter. He has been nominated six times for the Academy Award for Best Adapted Screenplay — for Forrest Gump (1994), The Insider (1999), Munich (2005), The Curious Case of Benjamin Button (2008), A Star Is Born (2018), and Dune (2021) — winning for Forrest Gump. He also worked on the screenplays for the Oscar-nominated films Ali (2001) and Extremely Loud & Incredibly Close (2011), as well as Martin Scorsese's upcoming film Killers of the Flower Moon.

Early life and education 
Roth was born in New York City, New York, into a Jewish family, the son of Miriam "Mimi", a teacher, studio executive, and radio writer, and Leon Roth, a university teacher and film producer.  He grew up in Bedford–Stuyvesant, Brooklyn in New York.  He grew up boxing and would credit some of his later successes to habits learned from the sport.

Roth went to college at the University of California, Santa Barbara and graduated in 1966. He later attended UCLA Film School as part of the class of 1973.

Career 
Roth won the Academy Award for Best Adapted Screenplay for Forrest Gump.  He is known for writing his scripts in a DOS program without Internet access, as well as distributing the scripts only in hard copy formats. He followed his Academy Award win by co-writing screenplays for several Oscar-nominated films, including The Insider, Munich, The Curious Case of Benjamin Button, and A Star Is Born.  While writing The Curious Case of Benjamin Button, he lost both of his parents, and as a result views the film as "...my most personal movie."

Personal life 
Roth lives in Santa Monica, California. He has five children, including documentary filmmaker Vanessa Roth, and filmmakers Geoffrey Roth and Alec Roth; and six grandchildren. 

Roth was one of the investors defrauded by Bernard Madoff in a Ponzi Scheme via Stanley Chais. He stated that his losses were heavy and he has lost his retirement money, although the full extent is unknown. As a result of the fraud and the associated losses, Roth sued the estate of Chais, who died on September 26, 2010.

Filmography

Film 
As writer

As producer

Television

Accolades

Academy Awards

British Academy Film Awards

Critics' Choice Movie Awards

Golden Globe Awards

Primetime Emmy Awards

Producers Guild of America Award

Satellite Awards

Writers Guild of America Awards

References

External links 
 

1945 births
21st-century American Jews
American male screenwriters
Best Adapted Screenplay Academy Award winners
Hugo Award-winning writers
Jewish American screenwriters
Living people
People associated with the Madoff investment scandal
Screenwriters from New York (state)
UCLA Film School alumni
University of California, Santa Barbara alumni
Writers from New York City
Writers Guild of America Award winners